Hoyerswerda railway station is a railway station in Hoyerswerda, Germany. The station is located on the Węgliniec–Roßlau line and operated by DB Station&Service.

Services

Railway services 
Train services are currently operated by DB Regio and Ostdeutsche Eisenbahn. At this time the following services call at the station:

All lines operate every two hours.

With lines S4 and RE 15 there are westward connections from Hoyerswerda to Ruhland every 60 minutes. From Ruhland further trains (lines RB 49 and RE 18) operate, so basically there are connections from Hoyerswerda to both Leipzig and Dresden every 60 minutes.

Line OE64 connects Hoyerswerda eastward to Niesky and Görlitz, but is currently replaced by buses due to construction works along Węgliniec–Roßlau railway.

Local transport 
City bus lines 1, 2, 3A and 4 as well as many regional bus lines frequently stop at this station.

References

External links
 

Railway stations in Saxony
railway station